Ivica Kulešević (born 31 October 1969) is a Croatian football manager and former player who is current the sporting director of Croatian  Football League club NK Osijek.

Managerial career

Osijek
On 17 October 2019, after he firstly worked as caretaker manager, Kulešević was appointed the head coach of Croatian First Football League club NK Osijek.

On 4 September 2020, Kulešević and Osijek parted ways.

References

External links

1969 births
Living people
Footballers from Osijek
Association football defenders
Yugoslav footballers
Croatian footballers
NK Osijek players
HNK Cibalia players
NK Hrvatski Dragovoljac players
NK Samobor players
Hapoel Petah Tikva F.C. players
HNK Šibenik players
Yugoslav First League players
Croatian Football League players
Liga Leumit players
Croatian expatriate footballers
Expatriate footballers in Israel
Croatian expatriate sportspeople in Israel
Croatian football managers
NK Osijek managers
HNK Rijeka non-playing staff